Federal Route 99, or Jalan Sedili, is a federal road in Johor, Malaysia. The 39.6 km (24.6 mi) roads connects Kampung Haji Mohd Jambi in Sedili to Bandar Mas. The Kilometre Zero of the Federal Route 99 starts at Bandar Mas, at its interchange with the Pengerang Highway (Federal Route 92).

Features
At most sections, the Federal Route 99 was built under the JKR R5 road standard, allowing maximum speed limit of up to 90 km/h.

List of junctions

References

Malaysian Federal Roads